Charles Wilson Tuckey (born 10 July 1935) is a former Australian politician who was a member of the House of Representatives from 1980 to 2010, representing the seat of O'Connor in Western Australia for the Liberal Party. He was a minister in the Howard Government.

Early life
Tuckey was born in Perth. Before entering the Federal Parliament, he was a businessman and hotelier.

From 23 May 1964 until 1 March 1965, Tuckey was the last mayor of the town of Carnarvon; after that date the Town was amalgamated into the Shire of Carnarvon. Tuckey went on to serve as the first Shire president from 22 May 1965 until June 1971. Thereafter he was a councillor for the Shire's Commercial Ward until 1979.

In 1967, while employed as a publican in Carnarvon, Tuckey was convicted of assault after striking an Aboriginal man with a length of steel cable and fined $50. The man was allegedly being held down by Tuckey's brother at the time. Tuckey has had the nickname "Ironbar" ever since.

Political career
In 1979, Tuckey was endorsed by the Liberal Party, ahead of the 1980 election, as its candidate for the then-new seat of O'Connor, covering a large section of rural Western Australia.  The demographics of the seat suggested that it should have been a National Country seat. Nevertheless, in 1980 a split between the federal and state branches of the National Country Party allowed Tuckey to win on Labor preferences.

Tuckey was one of the most controversial figures in Australian federal politics. In 1986 he taunted the then Labor Treasurer, Paul Keating, in Parliament about a former girlfriend called "Christine," leading Keating to call him "a piece of criminal garbage."  In one notorious exchange, Tuckey told Keating: "You are an idiot, you are a hopeless nong", to which Keating replied: "Shut up! Sit down and shut up, you pig ... Why do you not shut up, you clown? ... This man has a criminal intellect ... this clown continues to interject in perpetuity." The enraged Keating demanded that John Howard, who the previous year had become Leader of the Opposition, discipline Tuckey; but Howard refused. Keating then promised to make Howard "wear his leadership like a crown of thorns".  Keating and Howard's relationship, previously a civil one, deteriorated to the point where the two men refused to speak to one another.  Reportedly, the last time they talked privately was when Keating stormed into Howard's office, furiously berated him for not disciplining Tuckey, and walked out.

Tuckey was a member of the Opposition shadow ministry from 1984 to 1989 and again from 1993 to 1996. He was Deputy Manager of Opposition Business in the House from 1988 to 1989 and 1993 to 1994.

In 1989 a group of Liberal parliamentarians, including Tuckey, plotted to remove Howard from the Opposition leadership and give the position back to Andrew Peacock (who had already held it from 1983 to 1985). After the plan succeeded, Tuckey boasted about his actions in a Four Corners interview, which privately infuriated Howard.

Tuckey addressed an AIDS conference and opened by saying "you don't catch AIDS, you let somebody give it to you".

Frontbencher
As Minister for Forestry and Conservation from 1998 to 2001, Tuckey angered conservation groups through his support for the forestry industry. In 2002 he blamed the environmentalist movement for Australia's severe bushfire problem, saying that their opposition to controlled burning in national parks increased the risk of fires.

In a reshuffle after the 2001 election, Tuckey was made Minister for Regional Services, Territories and Local Government. His ministerial demise came in August 2003, when it was revealed that Tuckey had written to South Australian Police minister Patrick Conlon, on ministerial letterhead, asking Conlon to "review" his son's conviction on a traffic charge. Howard said that Tuckey's actions were foolish but refused to dismiss him. Tuckey resigned shortly afterwards and returned to the backbench.

Backbencher

In 2005 when the Australian parliament passed a motion asking Singaporean authorities that Van Tuong Nguyen not be executed for drug smuggling, Tuckey was the only member of parliament who refused to support the motion.

Tuckey was often quoted in the media as supporting free markets and less government intervention in the economy. He is also well known for criticising the National Party on a number of issues. He was the most outspoken critic of the AWB in Federal Parliament, and he led the push for this board to be stripped of its export monopoly for wheat. Tuckey labelled National Party politicians who supported the single-desk system as "drongos". He also labelled National Party senator Barnaby Joyce a "lightweight" for arguing in favour of foreign ownership restrictions on Medibank Private after privatization.

In August 2006, Tuckey had a public argument with Labor leader Kim Beazley over new immigration laws, ending with Tuckey calling Beazley a "fat so and so". A year later, Tuckey sent a fax to John Howard and several Liberal MPs suggesting the Prime Minister relinquish the leadership.

Queensland Aboriginal activist Sam Watson, in January 2008, branded Tuckey an "extreme racist" after Tuckey had publicly deplored the decision to display traditional dancers from one of the Aboriginal tribes which historically resides near Parliament House at the opening of Federal Parliament. Watson concluded, "Mr Tuckey and his extremist racist views really do belong to another generation."

On 13 February 2008, Tuckey walked out during the opening of the 42nd Australian Federal Parliament immediately after prayers, and pointedly before the Prime Minister Kevin Rudd made a motion of apology to the Stolen Generation. He was one of six Liberal MPs (including fellow West Australian MPs Luke Simpkins, Dennis Jensen and the late Don Randall as well as Sophie Mirabella and the late Alby Schultz) to leave the house in protest to the apology to the Stolen Generations, thereby boycotting the motion. On the steps of parliament, Tuckey was sarcastic about what the apology would achieve for indigenous people:
"I'm there to say hallelujah. Tomorrow there'll be no petrol sniffing, tomorrow little girls can sleep in their beds without any concern — it's all fixed.  The Rudd spin will fix it all. I've read it, I'm convinced. I think it's wonderful."

The following May, Tuckey was expelled from the house for 24 hours after breaching standards. His remarks against the Speaker arose during a heated question time in relation to the Rudd Government's 'Fuel Watch Scheme'. On 24 September 2008, Tuckey was again expelled from the house, this time for one hour, for an outburst during House of Representatives Question Time.

In March 2010, Tuckey said that acknowledging traditional landowners at official events was a "farce" and that he had "never thanked anyone for the right to be on the soil that is Australian".

Defeat
From 1983 to 2007, Tuckey held O'Connor without serious difficulty, usually taking between 62 and 75 percent of the two-party preferred vote.  At the 2007 federal election, Tuckey was reelected with 46 percent of the primary vote and a two-party margin of 67 percent against Labor.

However, at the 2010 federal election, Tuckey was defeated by Nationals WA candidate Tony Crook.  He suffered a post-redistribution primary vote swing of 10 percent and a two-candidate swing of 20 percent, finishing on a primary vote of 38 percent and a two-candidate vote of 46 percent against Crook.  He was 75 years old at the time of his defeat, making him the oldest sitting MP.

Tuckey broke his self-imposed silence after the election, verbally attacking Crook on a range of fronts. Tuckey described Crook as "a nobody who would be lucky to have his relatives turn up to hear his maiden speech in parliament".

In 2009 the year before his defeat he said he might seek to become the longest serving member of parliament by breaking the record held by former Prime Minister Billy Hughes.
However his defeat in 2010 dashed hopes of him achieving this record as it ended his 30 years in Parliament, nowhere near the 51 years served by Hughes from 1901 until his death in 1952.

References

External links

ABC The Drum – Wilson 'Ironbar' Tuckey

1935 births
Living people
Liberal Party of Australia members of the Parliament of Australia
Members of the Australian House of Representatives for O'Connor
Members of the Australian House of Representatives
People educated at Perth Modern School
Politicians from Perth, Western Australia
21st-century Australian politicians
20th-century Australian politicians
Mayors of places in Western Australia
Western Australian local councillors